Pick Aréna is an indoor sporting arena located in Szeged, Hungary. It was built on the site of the old arena, opening in 2021. It is primarily used as a venue for handball, with the first match taking place between Pick Szeged and German team THW Kiel in the EHF Champions League, which Szeged won 30–26. 

The arena hosted six matches as a venue for the 2022 European Men's Handball Championship.

References 

Handball venues in Hungary
Buildings and structures in Szeged
2021 establishments in Hungary
2021 in Hungarian sport
Sports venues completed in 2021